Agios Vlasios ( meaning Saint Blaise, before 1927: Καραμπάσι - Karampasi, Turkish: Karabaş "black head") is a village and a community in the municipal unit of Artemida, Magnesia, Greece. Agios Vlasios is situated on the slopes of mount Pelion, 1.5 km west of Agios Georgios Nileias, 2 km northeast of Ano Lechonia and 11 km east of Volos. Its population in 2011 was 515. The name comes from the church of the village.

Subdivisions
The community Agios Vlasios consists of the following villages:
Agios Vlasios [2011 pop: 322]
Malaki [pop: 113]
Palaiokastro [pop: 55]
Strofilos [pop: 25]

Population

History
During the Turkish Era, the village Palaiokastro which is located between Ano Lechonia and Agios Vlasios was inhabited by Turks. After Thessaly joined Greece in 1881 Agios Vlasios (then Karampasi) became a part of the municipality of Nileia. In 1912, it became an independent community. In 1997, Agios Vlasios became a part of the municipality of Artemida which has its seat at nearby Ano Lechonia. In 2010 Artemida became part of the municipality of Volos.

See also
List of settlements in the Magnesia regional unit

References

External links

 Agios Vlasios on GTP Travel Pages

Dissolved municipalities and communes in Greece
Populated places in Magnesia (regional unit)